Park So-yi (born March 12, 2012) is a South Korean child actress. She debuted through the television series Mistress (2018) and is best known for her roles in the films Deliver Us from Evil (2020) and Pawn (2020).

Life and career 

Park So-yi was born on March 12, 2012, in South Korea.

Debuting as a child actress at the age of 6 with OCN television series Mistress (2018), Park steadily gained domestic recognition for her role as Yoo-min in South Korean film, Deliver Us from Evil (2020). Her performance in the film earned her a nomination for the Best New Actress award in film at the Baeksang Arts Awards.

Park attended an audition to play 9-year-old Seung-yi who becomes collateral in the film Pawn (2020). There, she ranked first among 300 auditionees for the role.

On April 19, 2021 YG Entertainment revealed Park had joined as their newest addition of actors. A source from the label revealed: "We are happy to work with actress Park So-yi, who has solid acting skills and exceptional potential. We plan on supporting her to the fullest in order to present her abilities as an actress to her satisfaction."

Other ventures

Endorsements 

Following her debut in the television and film industry, Park was featured in her first-ever CF for  Kitchen. She was further scouted as an advertising model for brands Renault Samsung Motors's SM6, KT Corporation,  online learning platform  and Seoul Milk.

On January 18, 2021 SPA clothing apparel brand Top Ten Kids announced Park So-yi was appointed as its first-ever endorsement model and muse after 21 years of business. A representative from the brand stated: "Park So-yi was selected as the brand's "Little Muse" for her stylish and cute charm, as well as her rich emotions, as proven in various works."

Philanthropy 

On May 4, 2021 Park donated her entire talent fee that she received for her participation in the climate environmental change campaign entitled Rewrite by the Green Umbrella Children Foundation and Focus Media Korea. It will be used to support low-income families suffering from climate change through the Green Umbrella Children Foundation. Park stated: "I was really surprised to learn how a lot of toys are thrown away. We participated with the heart of hoping the Earth we will live in the future will not hurt."

Filmography

Film

Television series

Web series

Music video appearances

Awards and nominations

References

External links 
 
 
 

2012 births
21st-century South Korean actresses
Living people
South Korean film actresses
South Korean television actresses
South Korean child actresses
YG Entertainment artists